The Fraternity of Saint Vincent Ferrer (abbreviated FSVF) is a Catholic religious institute of pontifical right in full communion with the Holy See that follows Dominican spirituality and uses the traditional Dominican Rite. It is named after Vincent Ferrer, a Valencian Dominican priest.

History
The fraternity was founded in 1979 by Louis-Marie de Blignières and was initially sedeprivationist, but later reconciled with the Holy See and became a religious institute of pontifical right on 30 November 1988. The fraternity's priests use the traditional Dominican Rite for saying Mass and the hours of the Divine Office and are authorized to use the Dominican constitutions and habit, due to an indult granted to them in 1988. It is not a part of the Dominican Order.

The seat of the Fraternity is the monastery of Saint Thomas Aquinas in Chémeré-le-Roi, a village in north-west France between Laval and Le Mans.

See also
 Ecclesia Dei

References

External links
 

Institutes of consecrated life
Traditionalist Catholicism
Ecclesia Dei